The Ministry of Health (MISAN) is the department of the Government of Spain responsible for proposing and executing the government policy on health, planning and providing healthcare as well as the exercise of the powers of the General State Administration to assure citizens the right to health protection. The Ministry is headquartered in the Paseo del Prado in Madrid, opposite the Prado Museum.

Healthcare in Spain is provided by the National Health System, a decentralized organization composed by the regional health systems and the National Institute of Health Management, the health agency of the central government that provides health care to the autonomous cities of Ceuta and Melilla. According to Eurostat (2017 data), Spain spends 8.9% of GDP on health, approximately $104 billion (€86 billion).

According to the Annual Report of the National Health System 2019, the total expenditure of the Spanish health system in 2018 was 109.9 billion euros (77.4 billion corresponding to the public sector and 32.5 billion to the private sector). This represents 2,351 euros per capita and an expenditure of 9.1% of the Spanish GDP. As of 2018, regarding human resources, the NHS had 780,377 professionals. Of these, 188,166 are medical professionals, 274,633 nursing professionals, and 317,578 are other types of health professionals.

The Ministry is headed by the Minister of Health, who is appointed by the King of Spain at request of the Prime Minister. The Minister is assisted by three main officials, the Secretary of State for Health, the Secretary-General for Digital Health, Information and Innovation of the National Health System and the Under Secretary of Health. The current Health Minister is Carolina Darias.

History

Early period 
References can be found to the action of Government in public health and welfare in the 19th century. The Royal Decree of 9 November 1832 created a Ministry of Development, which included powers over "the field of health with the infirmaries, water and mineral baths" and "charitable institutions". A further Royal Decree of 10 March 1847, created a Department of Health, one of six that made up what is now the Ministry of the Interior.

First ministry 

State powers in this area remained with this department until 1933, when the Undersecretariat for Health and Charity was transferred to the Ministry of Labour, which then became known as the Ministry of Labour and Health. However, the first ministry focused on health was created on 4 November 1936, as the Ministry of Health and Social Assistance, with a woman holding a cabinet portfolio for the first time in the history of Spain: Federica Montseny. This ministry was short-lived. When the Prime Minister of the Republic, Juan Negrín, replaced Francisco Largo Caballero, the ministry was abolished and its powers were transferred to the Ministry of Labour (Social Assistance affairs) and to the Ministry of Public Instruction (Health affairs) by a Decree of May 1937. After the Spanish Civil War, the responsibility returned to the Ministry of the Interior until 1977.

Democratic period 
The Health Ministry was created again in the Constituent Legislature in 1977, integrating responsibilities for Health that were hitherto managed by the Ministry of the Interior, and the powers of the Undersecretariat for Social Security.

Royal Decree 1558 of 4 July 1977 established the ministry in its current form, including responsibility for Social Security. Staffing consisted of two undersecretariats (one for the domestic governance of the Department and other focused on Health), a Technical General Secretariat and six Directorates-General: Staff, Management and Finance; Social Benefits; Social Services; Healthcare; Pharmaceutical Management and Public Health and Veterinary Health.

For a short period between February and November 1981, Health was once again merged with Labour. Royal Decree 2823/1981, restored it to full ministerial rank but this time without social security which remained within the Labour ministry. With this reform the Ministry acquired competencies over Consumers Affairs (through the National Institute for Consumers Affairs). During the first years of the premiership of Felipe González and the National Health System and the National Transplant Organization were created thanks primarily to the impulse of the minister Ernest Lluch.

With the victory of the People's Party in the general election of 1996, José Manuel Romay Beccaría was appointed Minister of Health and Consumer Affairs, a position he held throughout the 6th Legislature. Under his direction was created in 1997, the Spanish Agency of Medicines and Medical Devices. In the 7th Legislature Celia Villalobos became minister (2000-2002) and achieved notoriety by her handling mad cow disease. She was succeeded by Ana Pastor Julián (2002-2004). The mad cow crisis precipitated the creation in 2011 of the Spanish Food Safety Agency, named since 2007 as Spanish Food Safety and Nutrition Agency.

At the beginning of the 8th legislature Elena Salgado assumed as Health Minister (2004-2007). With her, in 2004 the National Plan on Drugs, belonged to the Ministry of the Interior, was shifted to the Ministry of Health. Eight months before the end of the legislature, the scientific Bernat Soria assumed the office of Health Minister. In the next legislature Soria was confirmed as Minister of Health and Consumer Affairs, and he was succeeded by Trinidad Jiménez in 2009 following a cabinet reshuffle. Under Jiménez Social Policy was returned to the health portfolio, including the Institute for the Elderly and Social Services (IMSERSO), previously under Education.

Under minister Leire Pajín (October 2010-December 2011), responsibilities on Equality issues were added to her duties, previously under a separate ministry of its own, and also assuming the Institute for Women and the Institute for Youth. At the beginning of the 10th legislature Ana Mato became minister and the Ministry assumed (only functionally) the Charles III Health Institute (which still belonged to the Ministry of Economy). In addition, in January 2014 the Spanish Agency for Food Safety and Nutrition and the National Institute for Consumer Affairs merged giving rise to the new Spanish Agency for Consumer Affairs, Food Safety and Nutrition. On 24 November 2014, Mato resigned after being implicated in the corruption case known as Gürtel. On 3 December 2014, Alfonso Alonso succeeded her.

After the 2016 cabinet reshuffle, Dolors Montserrat was appointed Minister of Health and one of his first measures was to raise the rank of the Director of the National Transplant Organization to Director-General in order to strengthen this institution. Barely 1 year later after the assumption of Montserrat, the Güertel case that provoked the resignation of minister Mato also provoked in June 2018 the fall of the Rajoy government through a motion of no-confidence driven by the Leader of the Opposition Pedro Sánchez. After the success of the motion, Sánchez appointed Carmen Montón as Health Minister and the Ministry transferred the competences over equality to the Ministry of the Presidency. Montón also strengthen the consumers affairs competences by recovering the Directorate-General for Consumers Affairs and regained universal healthcare for undocumented immigrants. She resigned after three months in office after a degree scandal and María Luisa Carcedo succeeded her. Carcedo continued with the program established by Montón on fight against pseudosciences and recovering the Observatory of Women's Health.

A major restructuring occurred in 2020. The Department of Health lost all its competences on consumer affairs and social servicies, that were transferred to the ministries of Consumer Affairs and of Social Rights and 2030 Agenda, respectively. However, in exchange, the department assumed the government policies on drugs. During this time, Carcedo was replaced by Salvador Illa, who had to face the COVID-19 pandemic. It was precisely as a result of this pandemic that in August 2020 the department underwent a major reform in its structure, recovering the position of Secretary of State for Health (which already existed between 1979 and 1981) as second-in-command and creating the General Secretariat for Digital Health, Information and Innovation of the National Health System.

Structure 
The Ministry of Health is organised in the following superior bodies:

 The Secretariat of State for Health
 The Directorate-General for Public Health
The Coordination Centre for Health Alerts and Emergencies
 The Directorate-General for the Common Catalogue of Services of the National Health System and Pharmacy
 The Directorate-General for Professional Management
The Government Delegation for the National Plan on Drugs
 The General Secretariat for Digital Health, Information and Innovation of the National Health System
 The Directorate-General for Digital Health and Information Systems for the National Health System
 The Undersecretariat of Health
 Technical General Secretariat

In addition, the Department has two advisory bodies:

 The Advisory Council for Health and Social Services, as an advisory and assistance body in the formulation of health policy.
 The Committee of the professions of the health and social sector.

Ministry agencies 

Spanish Agency of Medicines and Medical Devices
Spanish Agency for Food Safety and Nutrition
National Transplant Organization
National Institute of Health Management

List of officeholders
Office name:
Ministry of Health and Social Assistance (1936–1937)
Minister of Health and Social Security (1977–1981)
Minister of Health and Consumer Affairs (1981–2009)
Minister of Health and Social Policy (2009–2010)
Minister of Health, Social Policy and Equality (2010–2011)
Minister of Health, Social Services and Equality (2011–2018)
Minister of Health, Consumer Affairs and Social Welfare (2018–2020)
Minister of Health (2020–present)

Notes

See also 

 History of Spain
 Politics of Spain
 Cabinet of Spain
 List of Spain-related topics

References

External links 
 Ministry of Health 

Health
Spain
Health
Ministries established in 1977
1977 establishments in Spain
Health
Health care in Spain